This is a list of films which have placed number one at the weekend box office in Brazil during 2007 (Amounts are in Brazilian reais; 1 real is approximately equivalent to 0.64 US dollars).

References
Filme B
  Tropa de Elite's final numbers
E-Pipoca

See also
List of Brazilian films — Brazilian films by year

Brazil
2007
2007 in Brazil